Şenyurt is a town in Turhal district of Tokat Province, Turkey. At  it is situated to the north of Turkish state highway  which connects Tokat to Amasya. The population of Şenyurt  is 2230  as of 2011. The settlement was founded in 1972 as a result of merging four neighbouring villages. The population of those villages were composed of Caucasus migrants of the 1850s. Main economic activity is fruit farming.

References

Populated places in Tokat Province
Towns in Turkey
Turhal District